The Ligue de Hockey Junior de Montréal or Montreal Junior Hockey League was a Junior "B" (Junior "AA" in Quebec) ice hockey league in Quebec, Canada, sanctioned by Hockey Canada.  The league's website was deleted in March 2006.

The teams

Champions
2005 Gouverneurs de Saint-Hubert

External links
Brossard
L'Est
Rosemont

Defunct ice hockey leagues in Quebec
C
Hockey Quebec